This list of notable Scottish musicians is part of the List of Scots series. Please see List of Scots#Composers for classical writers.

0–9
18 Wheeler, band
1990s, indie rock band

A
John Abell, countertenor, composer and lutenist
Aberfeldy, pop band
AC Acoustics
Stuart Adamson, Tattoo, The Skids, Big Country, and The Raphaels
Admiral Fallow, indie folk band
Adopted as Holograph, band
Adventures in Stereo, band
Aereogramme, rock band
Aerial, power-pop band
Pete Agnew, bassist and backing vocalist for Nazareth
Akala rapper, Scottish mother
Alestorm, pirate metal band
Albannach, band
John Alford
The Aliens, offshoot of the Beta Band
Charlie Allan, bandleader of Saor Patrol
James Allan, lead singer with Glasvegas
JD Allan, former member of The Blimp
Dot Allison, singer and songwriter, electronic music; former lead singer with band One Dove in the early 1990s
The Almighty
Altered Images
Alyth, singer
Mohsen Amini, concertinist. Co-founder and member of the folk trio Talisk and the folk band Ímar
The Amorettes, hard rock band
Amplifico, indie band
Amy Belle
Ian Anderson, singer, flautist, songwriter, and guitarist Jethro Tull
Miller Anderson, guitarist who played at Woodstock as a member of The Keef Hartley Band
Moira Anderson, singer
Tom Anderson (1910–1991), fiddler and composer
Chris Andreucci, country music singer/songwriter 
Aneka (aka Mary Sandeman), singer, Japanese Boy
Billie Anthony (1932–1991), singer
APB, band
The Apples, indie-dance band 
Arab Strap
Craig Armstrong, composer
Associates, duo
Astrid, band
Attic Lights, indie rock band
Average White Band, funk rock brass band
Jean Aylwin (1885–1964)
Aztec Camera, band

B
Back of the Moon
Howie B, musician, producer and DJ
Lady Grizel Baillie (1665–1746), songwriter
Aly Bain, fiddler
Jimmy Bain, bassist associated with Thin Lizzy, Rainbow and Dio
Ian Bairnson, guitarist of Pilot and The Alan Parsons Project
Balaam and the Angel, rock band
Ballboy, indie band
A Band Called Quinn
Band of the Royal Regiment of Scotland, official regimental military band
Jimmy Barnes
The Bathers, band
Battlefield Band
Malcolm Baxter, singer/songwriter, fronted punk band Last Words
Bay City Rollers, 1970s pop-rock sensations
Morag Beaton (1926–2010), dramatic soprano
The Beatstalkers
Callum Beattie, singer songwriter
Jim Beattie, founding member of Primal Scream, Spirea X and Adventures in Stereo
Callum Beaumont, bagpipe player
Beggars Opera, rock
Maggie Bell, rock and blues-rock singer
Paddie Bell (1931–2005), Scottish folk singer and musician
Belle & Sebastian, band
Nicola Benedetti, violinist
Martyn Bennett (1971–2005), Great Highland Bagpipes, Scottish smallpipes, violin, piano
Berlin Blondes
Guy Berryman, bass player in the band Coldplay
The Beta Band, folktronica
Shannon Bex, member of the group Danity Kane
Biff Bang Pow!, Alan McGee's band
Biffy Clyro, band
Big Country, band
The Big Dish, band
Bilbo, band
Billy Liar, acoustic punk/folk band
The Birthday Suit, indie rock band
Bis, band
Norman Blake, Teenage Fanclub
Blazin' Fiddles, folk
Bleed from Within, deathcore band
The Blimp, rock band
The Blow Monkeys
Blue
The Blue Nile, band
The Bluebells, band
BMX Bandits, twee/jangle-popfolktronica
Boards of Canada, downtempo/electronica group
Bodega, band
Boghall and Bathgate Caledonia Pipe Band
Eric Bogle, folk singer/songwriter
Bombay Talkie, Bhangra band
Bongshang, folktronica
Boots for Dancing, post-punk band
Christopher Bowes, vocalist/keytarist for Alestorm
Box Codax, band
Billy Boyd, singer with Beecake
Susan Boyle, singer
Stuart Braithwaite, guitarist of Mogwai
Breabach, folk music band
Billy Bremner, guitarist
Broken Records, indie folk band
Sandy Brown (1929–75), jazz clarinettist
Scott Brown, DJ and music producer
Ronnie Browne, "The Voice", founding member of The Corries
Jack Bruce (1943-2014), bassist with Cream
Wattie Buchan, lead vocalist for The Exploited
Isobel Buchanan, operatic soprano
Margo Buchanan, singer-songwriter, composer, musician, and recording artist
Charlie Burchill, guitarist of Simple Minds
John Davie Burgess (1934–2005), bagpiper
Yvie Burnett, mezzo-soprano singer and vocal coach
Barry Burns
Cha Burns (1957–2007), guitarist for The Silencers
Jenn Butterworth, acoustic folk guitarist and singer 
David Byrne (born 1952)

C
Café Jacques, progressive rock band
Calamateur, singer, songwriter, musician
Camera Obscura, band
Isla Cameron (c.1930–1980)
Darius Campbell Danesh (1980–2022), singer-songwriter
Grant Campbell, singer/songwriter
Isobel Campbell, singer formerly of Belle & Sebastian
Jon Campbell, singer, producer, keyboard player, songwriter, and frontman of the band The Time Frequency 
Junior Campbell, founding member, lead guitarist, piano player, and singer with the band Marmalade
Kenna Campbell, Scottish singer, teacher, tradition bearer and advocate for Gaelic language, culture and song.
Mairi Campbell, singer, composer, violinist, fiddler
Tracyanne Campbell, singer of band Camera Obscura
Cannon, instrumental post-rock band
Lewis Capaldi, singer-songwriter
Capercaillie, folk band
Captain Face, rock band
Sally Carr, lead singer of Middle of the Road
The Cateran, rock band
Cartoone, band
Nicola Cassells, soprano
The Cathode Ray, alternative band
Ceilidh Minogue, ceilidh band
Celtic Thunder, band
The Chimes, dance music trio
Colin Chisholm, lead singer of Bilbo
Duncan Chisholm, fiddle player, founder member of Wolfstone
George Chisholm, jazz trombonist
Chvrches, alternative electronic band
Cindytalk band formed by members of The Freeze now a solo project for Gordon Sharp
The Cinematics, alternative rock band
Gerry Cinnamon, singer-songwriter
Clann An Drumma, tribal band
Bryan Clarke, Napalm Stars, punk rock band
Zal Cleminson, guitarist 
Philip Clemo, composer, musician, record producer, sound artist
Close Lobsters, band
Clouds, 1966–71, forerunners of progressive rock
The Clouds, 1980s indie band
The Clutha, traditional Scottish band
Cocteau Twins, band
Codeine Velvet Club, alternative rock band
Coast, band
Richard Colburn, drummer
Edwyn Collins, musician, producer and record label owner
Chris Connelly, musician and singer/songwriter
Billy Connolly, comedian and singer, scored a UK No. 1
Brian Connolly, vocalist with Sweet
Conquering Animal Sound
Iain Cook, musician, composer, record producer. A member of the band Chvrches. He played guitar for Aereogramme, and was a member of The Unwinding Hours.
Mick Cooke, musician and composer
Gawain Erland Cooper, folk guitarist and singer with Erland and the Carnival
Jimmy Cooper, hammered dulcimer player
The Cooperation Band, brass band
Alex Cornish, singer/songwriter
Correcto, rock supergroup
The Corries, band
Cosmic Rough Riders, band
Lorne Cousin, bagpipe player
James Crabb, classical accordionist
Gordon Cree, singer, pianist, organist, arranger, orchestrator, conductor and composer
Stuart Crichton, Songwriter/Producer
Charlotte Gordon Cumming, singer/songwriter and music producer
Johnny Cunningham (1957–2003), fiddle player
Phil Cunningham, accordionist
Justin Currie (born 1964), singer, songwriter and bassist with Del Amitri
Ian Cussick, singer/songwriter
Ivor Cutler (1923-2006), singer, songwriter and humorist

D
Dàimh, folk band
Glen Daly (c.1930–1987)
Dananananaykroyd, band
Darius Danesh (born 1980), singer, songwriter, and guitarist
Danny Wilson, band
Stuart David
Les Davidson, guitarist
Dawn of the Replicants, indie rock quintet
Clarita de Quiroz (born 1984), Grade 8 pianist, Grade 8 percussionist, singer, songwriter and model
De Rosa, rock band
Deacon Blue, band
Dead or American, alternative rock band
Degrassi, band
Del Amitri, band
The Delgados, band
Jackie Dennis
Denny and Dunipace Pipe Band, Grade 3B pipe band
Karl Denver (1931–98), singer
Desalvo, metalcore band
Jimmy Deuchar (1930–93), jazz trumpeter
Sydney Devine (1940–2021)
Jim Dewar (1942-2002), vocalist and bassist with Robin Trower Band and Stone The Crows
Jim Diamond
Murray Dickie (1924–1995), tenor opera singer
Barbara Dickson, singer
Django Django
Dogs Die in Hot Cars, band
Donaldson, Moir and Paterson, rock group
Lonnie Donegan, skiffle musician
Donovan (born 1946)
Daniel Dow, traditional Scottish musician and composer
Patrick Doyle
The Dreaming, Celtic rock
Kris Drever
Ivan Drever, folk singer, songwriter and guitarist
Drive-By Argument, band
Bill Drummond (born 1953), singer/songwriter, Big in Japan guitarist, Zoo Records founder, The Justified Ancients of Mu Mu/The Timelords/The KLF/2K frontman, K Foundation artist, writer
Drums of Death, electronic musician
Graeme Duffin, lead guitarist for Wet Wet Wet
Irvin Duguid, session musician/composer
Charles Davidson Dunbar, DCM (1870–1939), first pipe major in Britain and the Empire to be commissioned as a pipe officer
Amy Duncan, singer/songwriter and multi-instrumentalist
C Duncan, composer and musician
Gordon Duncan (1964–2005), bagpiper and composer
Malcolm "Molly" Duncan (1945–2019), tenor saxophonist formerly with Mogul Thrash, founding member of Average White Band
Andy Dunlop, lead guitarist of Travis
Joy Dunlop, Gaelic singer
Sophia Dussek (1775–1831), singer, pianist, harpist, and composer
Alex Duthart (1925–1986), drummer
The Dykeenies, indie rock band
Dysart and Dundonald Pipe Band

E
Eagleowl, post-folk band
Carla J. Easton
Sheena Easton (born 1959)
Joe Egan, singer with Stealers Wheel
Egebamyasi, house artist from Inverness
The Electrics, Celtic rock band 
Richard Elliot, saxophonist
El Mafrex, Urban Contemporary Gospel
El Presidente, band
Robert Emery (1794–1871), songwriter
Emma's Imagination, singer
Marcus Eoin (born 1970), electronic musician, Boards of Canada
Errors, post-electro band
Eugenius, founded by Eugene Kelly, formerly known as Captain America
Nathan Evans 
Ex-Simple Minds, New Wave/rock band
The Exploited, punk band

F
Fairground Attraction
Al Fairweather
Kyle Falconer, lead singer of The View
 Fatherson
Fiction Factory, new wave band
Fiddlers' Bid, instrumental group
Findo Gask, band
The Fire Engines
Firebrand Boy, chiptune and electropop producer 
Fish (born 1958), singer
Archie Fisher, folk singer and songwriter
Scott Fitzgerald
Dave Flett, guitarist Manfred Mann's Earth Band
Kat Flint, singer/songwriter
The Flowers, post-punk band
Derek Forbes, bassist, vocalist, and sometime guitarist
Dean Ford (1945–2018), singer and songwriter Marmalade
Jessie Fordyce (1905–2003), "harmony" part trio harmony singer with the Three X Sisters. She was born (1905) in Scotland. Raised primarily in Brooklyn, NY USA.
Forever More, band
FOUND, experimental pop band and arts collective
Julie Fowlis, singer and multi-instrumentalist
Foxface, band
Roddy Frame, songwriter with Aztec Camera
Fran and Anna
Franz Ferdinand, band
Alasdair Fraser, fiddler
Elizabeth Fraser, vocalist with Cocteau Twins
The Fratellis
The Freeze (Scottish band), post-punk band from Llinlithgow 1976-1981 
Alan Frew, vocalist with Glass Tiger
Friends Again
Frightened Rabbit
The Fuse (Scottish band)
Future Pilot A.K.A.
Futuristic Retro Champions
Iona Fyfe, folk singer
Will Fyffe (1885–1947)

G
Gary Innes, Traditional and Folk
Gawain Erland Cooper (born 1985), Orcadian composer 
Paul Galbraith, classical guitarist
Benny Gallagher, singer-songwriter and multi-instrumentalist, half of Gallagher and Lyle 
Gallagher and Lyle
Ganger, Glasgow alt rock band
Mary Garden (1874–1967), operatic soprano
Alex Gardner, pop singer
Willie Gardner
Ricky Gardiner, guitarist and composer for David Bowie and Iggy Pop
Dick Gaughan, traditional and political folk singer and songwriter
Geneva, Aberdeen alt rock band
John Giblin
Sir Alexander Drummond Gibson (1926–1995), conductor and opera intendant
Dave Gibson, singer/songwriter
Robert Gilfillan (1798–1850), poet and songwriter
Bobby Gillespie, singer with Primal Scream
Anne Lorne Gillies
Glasgow Police Pipe Band, grade one pipe band
Glasvegas
Chris Glen, bassist, The Sensational Alex Harvey Band, Michael Schenker Group
Hamish Glencross, guitarist for My Dying Bride
Evelyn Glennie (born 1965), percussionist
The Golden Dawn
Goodbye Mr Mackenzie, band; formed a side-project named Angelfish with member Shirley Manson on vocals
Nathaniel Gow (1763–1831), son of Niel Gow, performer, composer and arranger of tunes, songs and other pieces
Niel Gow (1727–1807), the Perthshire Fiddler
Eve Graham, singer with The New Seekers
James Grant, singer/songwriter
Jack Green
Stan Greig (1930–2012), jazz pianist, drummer, and bandleader
Ged Grimes, bass player for Simple Minds
Clare Grogan, singer with Altered Images
The Groovy Little Numbers, band
Gun, band
Robin Guthrie, founder of Cocteau Twins
The Gyres, band

H
H2O, band
Paul Haig, singer and co founder of Josef K
Rachel Hair, folk harpist
Robin Hall, folk singer
Ainsley Hamill, singer-songwriter 
Jo Hamilton, vocalist, composer and multi-instrumentalist
Susan Hamilton, soprano
Ian Hampton, bassist for Sparks
The Happy Family, post punk band
Harem Scarem, folk band
Calvin Harris, electronic musician
Roddy Hart, singer/songwriter in The Lonesome Fire
Alex Harvey (1935–1982), blues and rock musician in The Sensational Alex Harvey Band
Leslie Harvey (1944–1972), guitarist
Jimmy Hastings
Pye Hastings, guitarist and vocalist for Caravan 
Colin Hay (born 1953), singer with Men at Work
The Hazey Janes
The Headboys, power pop band
Fran Healy, singer in band Travis
Hector Bizerk, experimental hip-hop group
The Hedrons
Helicopter Girl
Ainslie Henderson, singer/songwriter
Ewen Henderson, multi-instrumentalist folk musician
Mike Heron, singer, songwriter and multi-instrumentalist
Corrina Hewat, harpist and composer
Lou Hickey
Hiding Place, rock band
Lizzie Higgins (1929–1993), ballad singer
Hip Parade, band
Hipsway, band
Greg Holden, singer- songwriter
Holocaust, heavy metal band
Honeyblood, band
Horse, singer-songwriter 
How to Swim, pop/rock band
Andrew Howie, singer/songwriter, producer and music tutor
RM Hubbert, guitarist and singer
Hudson Mohawke, producer, DJ and composer
Hue & Cry, band
Alistair Hulett (1951–2010), acoustic guitar and vocals, Roaring Jack
The Humblebums
John Law Hume (1890–1912), violinist on the RMS Titanic
Willie Hunter (1933–1994), folk fiddler
The Hurricanes, rhythm & blues group
Scott Hutchison (1981–2018), singer, songwriter, guitarist. Founding member of Frightened Rabbit
Kenny Hyslop, drummer

I
Idlewild
Illyus & Barrientos, electronic music duo 
Ímar, folk band
Hamish Imlach, folk singer
The Incredible String Band
Kenny Inglis, composer and producer
Andrew Innes, guitarist in Primal Scream
Gary Innes
Insight, engineer, producer, Vocalist
Inveraray & District Pipe Band, Grade 1 pipe band
Iron Claw, band
The Iron Horse, Celtic music band
Iron Virgin, glam rock band
Craig Irving

J
Leon Jackson, winner of the fourth series of the X-Factor
Milton Jackson, DJ, record producer 
Stevie Jackson
Jacob Yates and the Pearly Gate Lock Pickers, band
Bert Jansch
The Jasmine Minks, band from Aberdeen, early Creation Records signing
Jazzateers, pop/post-punk group
Ben Jelen (born 1979), singer/songwriter, musician
Jesse Garon and the Desperadoes, band
The Jesus and Mary Chain, band
Richard Jobson, lead singer of The Skids, The Armoury Show
Davey Johnstone, rock guitarist and vocalist (born in Edinburgh), best known for his work with Elton John, Alice Cooper, and Meat Loaf
Duncan Johnstone (1925–1999), bagpiper and composer
Jonny, two-person band
Josef K, band
Kathryn Joseph, singer/songwriter
Ruarri Joseph, singer/songwriter
Jackie Joyce, also known as Helicopter Girl
JSD Band, Celtic and folk rock band

K
Ramsey Kanaan, singer
Pat Kane, lead singer of Hue and Cry
Richard Kass, session drummer
Kassidy, band
The Kazoo Funk Orchestra, band
Johnny Keating
David Keenan
Brian Kellock, jazz pianist
Eugene Kelly, founding member of The Vaselines and Eugenius
Calum Kennedy (1928–2006), singer
David Kennedy (1825–1886), church musician and concert giver
Mary Ann Kennedy, singer
Marjory Kennedy-Fraser (1857–1930), singer, composer and arranger
Ally Kerr, singer/songwriter
Jim Kerr (born 1959), singer and founding member of Simple Minds
Keser, band
Mary Kiani, singer
Kid Canaveral, band
Carol Kidd, jazz singer
Jim Kilpatrick, pipe band drummer
Sandy Kilpatrick, singer/songwriter
Alan King, lead singer of the rock band Walk on Fire
King Creosote, singer/songwriter
Niki King, jazz and soul-funk singer/songwriter
Alison Kinnaird, harpist
Kinnaris Quintet
David Knopfler, co-founder of the rock band Dire Straits
Mark Knopfler (born 1949), guitarist, Dire Straits frontman
Kode9, electronic musician
Konx-Om-Pax, electronic musician

L
Griogair Labhruidh, Scottish Gaelic poet, musician, and hip-hop producer/MC 
The LaFontaines, band
La Paz
Chris Lake, house musician, mau5trap
Frederic Lamond (1868–1948), classical pianist, second-to-last surviving pupil of Franz Liszt
Land, Christian music band
The Last Battle, indie alt-pop band
Lau, folk band featuring Kris Drever
Harry Lauder (1870–1950), music hall singer
The Law
William Lawrie (1881–1916), bagpiper and composer
Mary Lee (born 1921), singer
Storm Lee
Durward Lely (1855–1944), opera singer
Lemonescent, girl group
Annie Lennox, singer, formerly in the Eurythmics
Jackie Leven, folk musician
Stuart Liddell, bagpiper
Life Without Buildings
Alex Ligertwood, formerly vocalist with Santana
Rona Lightfoot (born 1936), piper and singer
Linus Loves, dance music remixer/producer
Little Eye
Little Fire, singer/songwriter
Gav Livz
Lloyd Cole and the Commotions
Jaz Lochrie, bass guitarist with Bad Company
Cecilia Loftus (1876–1943)
Logan, rock band
Craig Logan, former bassist of the pop band Bros
Ella Logan (1913–1969), singer
Loki, rapper
Lone Pigeon
Long Fin Killie (1993–1998)
Alan Longmuir (1948–2018), bass guitarist, a founding member of the Bay City Rollers
Looper
Lord Cut-Glass
Roddy Lorimer, musician who plays trumpet and flugelhorn
Love and Money
Gerard Love, Teenage Fanclub
Lulu (born 1948)
Lungleg, indie band
The Luvvers, rock group
Billy Lyall (1953–1989)
Graham Lyle, singer-songwriter, guitarist and producer, half of Gallagher and Lyle
Lyn-Z, bass guitarist of Mindless Self Indulgence
Yvonne Lyon

M
Hector MacAndrew (1903–1980), fiddler
Ishbel MacAskill (1941–2011), Scottish Gaelic singer and teacher
Jimmy MacBeath (1894–1972), singer
Lauren MacColl, fiddler
Donald Ban MacCrimmon (d. 1746), bagpiper
Red Donald MacCrimmon (d. 1825), bagpiper
Black John MacCrimmon (d. 1822), bagpiper
Hamish MacCunn (1868–1916), composer, conductor and teacher
Amy MacDonald, singer
The MacDonald Brothers
Calum MacDonald, percussionist of the band Runrig
Catriona MacDonald, fiddler and teacher
Finlay MacDonald (born 1978), bagpiper and composer
Roddy MacDonald (born 1956), pipe major, bagpiper and composer
Rory Macdonald, bassist of the band Runrig
Sydney MacEwan, singer (1908–1991)
Bruce MacGregor, fiddler and broadcaster
Jimmy MacGregor, folk singer
Kathleen MacInnes
Maggie MacInnes, folk singer and clàrsach player
Colin MacIntyre, also known as Mull Historical Society
Alexander Mackenzie (1847–1935), composer, conductor and teacher
Billy Mackenzie, singer
Fiona J. Mackenzie, Gaelic singer
Talitha MacKenzie
The Mackenzies, indie band
Maeve Mackinnon, folk singer
Dave Mackintosh, DragonForce drummer
Iain MacKintosh (1932–2006)
Robert Mackintosh (c. 1745–1807), violinist and composer
Jessie MacLachlan (1866–1916), Gaelic soprano
Dougie MacLean (born 1954), contemporary folk songwriter
Flora MacNeil, Gaelic singer (1928–2015)
Donald MacLeod (1917–1982), bagpiper
Jim MacLeod (1928-2004), bandleader, musician and broadcaster
Roddy MacLeod (born 1962), bagpiper, principal of the National Piping Centre
James MacMillan, contemporary classical composer
Catherine-Ann MacPhee, Gaelic singer
Mac-Talla, Scottish Gaelic "supergroup"
The Magnificents, electro rock band
Alan Mair, bassist from The Only Ones
Make Model, band
Steven Malcolmson, songwriter, record producer
Malinky, folk band
Jo Mango, alternative folk and acoustic band
Mànran, band
Shirley Manson (born 1966), singer/songwriter, Garbage frontwoman, formerly of Goodbye Mr Mackenzie and Angelfish
Kelly Marie, singer
Marmaduke Duke
Marmalade, pop/rock band and first Scottish group to ever top the UK chart
Helen Marnie, lead singer of Ladytron
Michael Marra (1952–2012), singer/songwriter and musician
Lena Martell, singer
The Martians, rock band
Bill Martin
Sarah Martin
Malcolm Martineau (1960–), pianist
John Martyn (1948–2009), folk/rock/jazz singer and guitarist
Sonny J Mason, singer, songwriter, and producer, also known as Justin Osuji
Steve Mason
Hans Matheson
Karen Matheson, lead singer of Capercaillie
Muir Mathieson (1911–75), conductor and composer
Lauren Mayberry, lead singer of Chvrches
MC-VA, rapper, record producer, songwriter and entrepreneur
Dan McCafferty, lead singer of Nazareth
The McCalmans
Willie McCallum, bagpipe player
Angela McCluskey, lead singer in Wild Colonials
Alyth McCormack, singer
Stevie McCrorie, singer-songwriter, won the fourth series of The Voice UK in 2015
Gordeanna McCulloch (1946-2019), folksong and ballad singer The Clutha
Kevin McDermott, singer/songwriter
Terry McDermott, rock singer with Driveblind
Alastair McDonald (musician)
Horse McDonald, singer-songwriter 
Nicholas McDonald, singer
Shelagh McDonald
Rose McDowall, vocalist, most notably of Strawberry Switchblade and Sorrow
Jai McDowall
Johnny McElhone, founding member of Altered Images, Hipsway and Texas
Alan McGee, founder of Creation Records; former member of The Revolving Paint Dream and Biff Bang Pow!
John McGeoch (1955–2004)
Gerry McGhee, singer in the band Brighton Rock
Raymond McGinley, Teenage Fanclub
Matt McGinn (1928–1977)
Kerry McGregor (1974–2012)
Lorraine McIntosh, singer with Deacon Blue
Catriona McKay, harpist and composer
Kevin McKay, DJ, electronic musician, record label owner and record producer
Licorice McKechnie
Frances McKee, singer and songwriter in The Vaselines
Kenneth McKellar, singer
Jackie McKeown, lead singer and guitarist for The Yummy Fur and 1990s
Murray McLachlan, concert pianist 
Morag McLaren
Marie McLaughlin
Ewan McLennan, folk musician and singer-songwriter
Michelle McManus, Pop Idol winner
Tony McManus, steel-string guitarist
Andy McMaster, bass, keyboards, vocals, songwriter for The Motors (1977–1980)
Colin McMaster (1960–1990), lead singer for Heart Industry and The Steel Chain
Brian McNeill, a founding member of the Battlefield Band
Meat Whiplash
Mendeed, Glaswegian metal band
Mercury Tilt Switch, rock band
Meursault, indie folk band from Edinburgh
Middle of the Road, pop group
Malcolm Middleton
Frankie Miller, blues/rock singer, guitarist and songwriter
Siobhan Miller, folk singer
Lisa Milne, soprano
Paddy Milner, singer-songwriter 
George Mitchell (1917–2002), creator of The Black and White Minstrel Show
Aidan Moffat
Mogwai, post-rock band
Hudson Mohawke, electronic music producer/DJ
Momus
Andrew Montgomery, singer
Shona Mooney, fiddle player
Hamish Moore, maker and player of Scottish smallpipes
Fred Morrison (born 1963), bagpiper and composer
Iain Morrison, musician and singer/songwriter
Tom Morton, broadcaster and musician
Mother and the Addicts
The Motorcycle Boy, indie pop band
Paul Mounsey
Mouth Music
Mr Egg (born 1959), formerly known as James McDonald, singer/songwriter, Egebamyasi, progenitor of acid house music
Jim Mullen, jazz guitarist
Mungo's Hi Fi
Donnie Munro, former lead singer of Runrig
Stuart Murdoch (born 1968), singer/songwriter, Belle & Sebastian frontman
Neil Murray, bass player, best known for his work in Whitesnake, The Brian May Band and Black Sabbath
My Latest Novel, melodic indie pop band
Mylo, DJ

N
Na Gathan, indie rock band
Findlay Napier
Peter Nardone, countertenor, organist, choirmaster and composer
National Park, band
Natural Acoustic Band, acid-folk band
Nazareth, band
The Nectarine No. 9, indie band 
The Needles, band
Simon Neil, lead singer and guitarist with Biffy Clyro
Nina Nesbitt, singer/songwriter
Rachel Newton, singer and harpist
Nicolette, singer/songwriter
Maggie Nicols
Nightcrawlers, band with DJ and producer John Reid
Niteworks, electronic Celtic fusion band 
No Way Sis
Rab Noakes, singer, songwriter and producer
North Atlantic Oscillation
Paolo Nutini, singer/songwriter
Nyah Fearties, band

O
Maeve O'Boyle, singer and songwriter
Octopus, Britpop band
Mike Ogletree, drummer and guitarist
Oi Polloi, anarcho-punk band
Old Blind Dogs, folk/blues
One Dove
One in a Million, psychedelic rock band
Barrie-James O'Neill, singer and songwriter
Jimme O'Neill, singer and guitarist, lead singer of The Silencers
Orange Juice, Glasgow-based post-punk band
The Orchids
Aidan O'Rourke, contemporary folk music fiddle player and composer
Ossian, band
Justin Osuji, singer, songwriter, and producer, also known as Sonny J Mason
Over The Wall
Owl John

P
Pallas, progressive rock band
The Pastels, band
Alistair Iain Paterson, musician and composer
David Paton, singer, guitarist and bassist with Pilot, The Alan Parsons Project, Camel
Davey Pattison, lead singer of Gamma
Owen Paul, singer
Dougie Payne, bassist and backing vocalist of Travis
PAWS, alternative rock band
Pearl and the Puppets
Pearlfishers
Peat and Diesel
Peatbog Faeries
The Phantom Band
The Pictish Trail
Pilot, band
The Poets, band
Political Asylum
Emma Pollock, singer, songwriter, and guitarist; a founding member of The Delgados
Karine Polwart
The Porridge Men
Positive Noise
Frankie Poullain, bass player for The Darkness
Ian Powrie, country dance musician and fiddle player
Primal Scream, band
The Primary 5, band
The Primevals, rock group
Christine Primrose, Gaelic singer and music teacher
Neil Primrose, drummer of Travis 
The Proclaimers
Pumajaw

Q
QFX
Finley Quaye
Monica Queen
The Questions, pop band
Paul Quinn, vocalist and songwriter

R
Jesse Rae
John Rae, drummer, band leader, composer
Gerry Rafferty, singer/songwriter, Stealers Wheel
Chris Rainbow (1946–2015)
The Raphaels, alternative country music band
Hannah Rarity, singer-songwriter 
Eddi Reader
Red Hot Chilli Pipers
Rick Redbeard, musician, singer and songwriter
Jean Redpath (1937–2014), folk singer
Alan Reid,  folk multi-instrumentalist and songwriter
Jenna Reid, fiddle player
Johnny Reid, country singer
Meston Reid (1945–1993), opera singer 
Neil Reid, child singing star
Maggie Reilly, singer/songwriter
Tommy Reilly
The Reindeer Section
Remember Remember, instrumental band
Robert Rental
The Revolving Paint Dream, Andrew Innes' first band, also featuring Alan McGee
The Rezillos, Edinburgh nu wave punk band
The Rich, Edinburgh indie band
Rico
Manda Rin, singer/songwriter with band bis
Billy Ritchie, musician and composer of Clouds
Ian Ritchie, saxophonist, producer and composer
The River Detectives
Alasdair Roberts, folk musician
Arthur Scott Robertson (1911–2000), fiddle player
B.A. Robertson, songwriter
Brian Robertson, guitarist for Thin Lizzy and Motörhead
Eric Robertson, composer
Jeannie Robertson (1908–1975), folk singer
Stanley Robertson (1940–2009), storyteller and ballad singer
Harry Robertson
Seb Rochford, drummer and bandleader, Polar Bear
Rock Salt & Nails, band
Annie Ross, jazz singer
Malcolm Ross, guitarist
Ricky Ross, lead singer of Deacon Blue
Rote Kapelle, post punk/indie pop band
Roys Iron DNA, indie band
Runrig, Gaelic rock band
RURA, folk band
Rustie
Louise Rutkowski, singer

S
Sacred Paws, rock band
Isla St Clair
Saint Jude's Infirmary, indie band
Salsa Celtica, Latin/folk fusion band
Emeli Sandé, singer
Mary Sandeman (aka Aneka), traditional singer, solo and with Scottish Fiddle Orchestra, Gaelic Mod gold medallist
Michael Sandison (born 1970), electronic musician, Boards of Canada
Saor Patrol, folk band
Paul Savage, drummer in The Delgados
Scars, band
Scatter, band
Bon Scott (1946–1980), singer for band AC/DC
David Scott, founder and leader of The Pearlfishers
Mike Scott (born 1958)
Scottish Chamber Orchestra
ScottishPower Pipe Band
The Secret Goldfish
Shuna Scott Sendall, dramatic soprano opera singer
The Sensational Alex Harvey Band
Sergeant, band
Rachel Sermanni
Serpico, punk/metal band
The Shamen
Jimmy Shand (1908–2000)
Gordon Sharp. singer with The Freeze and currently Cindytalk as well as a contributor to This Mortal Coil
Donald Shaw
Eilidh Shaw, fiddle player and singer
Rebecca Shearing, pop singer
The Shermans
Shetland Fiddlers' Society, group of fiddlers
Sean Shibe, classical and electric guitarist
Scott Shields, film composer, musician and record producer. Best known as a member of Joe Strummer's band The Mescaleros
Shooglenifty, Celtic fusion band
The Shop Assistants, indie pop band
Shotts and Dykehead Caledonia Pipe Band, grade 1 pipe band
Derek Shulman, lead singer for Simon Dupree and the Big Sound and Gentle Giant
SHY & DRS
The Side, band
The Silencers
Silibil N' Brains, hip-hop duo
Silly Wizard, folk group
Simple Minds
Habbie Simpson (1550–1620), town piper in Kilbarchan, Renfrewshire
Tom Simpson, keyboardist for Snow Patrol
The Singing Kettle, folk music group
Skerryvore, Celtic rock group
Skids, band
Grahame Skinner
Skipinnish, traditional Scottish band
Slam, house and techno DJs and producers
SleepResearch_Facility
Slik, Midge Ure's first band
Sluts of Trust
Emily Smith, singer
Martin Smith (1957–1994)
Tommy Smith, jazz saxophonist, composer, educator and bandleader (Scottish National Jazz Orchestra)
Alex Smoke, music producer and DJ
David Sneddon, singer/songwriter
Snow Patrol, band formed in Dundee
Snowblood, sludge/post-rock/doom metal band
The Snuts, indi band
Jimmy Somerville
Sons and Daughters, band
SOPHIE (1986–2021), musician, record producer, singer, songwriter, and DJ
Soup Dragons, band
Spare Snare, band
Spirea X, Greenock psychedelic band
Spirit of Scotland Pipe Band
Sharleen Spiteri, singer, songwriter, guitarist and lead vocalist of Texas
The Spook School, indie pop band
Barry St. John (1943–2020), singer
Adam Stafford, lead singer of Y'all is Fantasy Island
Stanley Odd, alternative hip-hop group
Stapleton, rock band
Robyn Stapleton, singer
Mike Starrs
Star Wheel Press
Stealers Wheel
Colin Steele, jazz trumpeter, composer
Steg G
Freddie Stevenson, singer-songwriter 
Al Stewart
Andy Stewart (1933–1993)
Andy M. Stewart, singer, formerly of Silly Wizard
Duglas T. Stewart, leader of BMX Bandits
Ian Stewart, keyboardist and co-founder of The Rolling Stones
Rachel Stewart, singer and folk dancer, a founding member of Beauty School
Sheila Stewart, Traditional singer (1937–2014)
Stiltskin
Stone The Crows
Chris Stout
Strawberry Switchblade, band
Stretchheads, punk band
Hamish Stuart
Sucioperro, rock band
Suckle, indie pop band formed by Vaselines member Frances McKee
The Supernaturals
Superstar
The Sutherland Brothers, folk and soft rock duo
Stuart Sutcliffe (1940–1962), original bass player of The Beatles
Katie Sutherland, vocals/guitar with Pearl and the Puppets
Swanee, rock singer, elder brother of Jimmy Barnes

T
Talisk, folk band
Malachy Tallack, singer/songwriter
The Tannahill Weavers, folk group
Katie Targett-Adams, singer/songwriter-MC and Celtic harpist
Taurpis Tula, band
John Taylor, fiddler
Julienne Taylor, singer/songwriter
Teenage Fanclub
Telstar Ponies
Joe Temperley (1929–2016), jazz saxophonist 
Ten Tonne Dozer, groove metal band
Terra Diablo
Texas
Sandi Thom
Dougie Thomson, bass player of Supertramp
Paul Thomson, drummer of Franz Ferdinand,
William Thomson (1695–1753)
The Little Kicks, band in Aberdeen
The Threats, UK82 punk band from Edinburgh/Dalkeith
Thrum, indie rock band
Tide Lines, four-piece band 
The Time Frequency
Tom McGuire & The Brassholes, funk soul band from Glasgow
Ricky Toner, singer, blues harp and guitarist 
Torphichen and Bathgate Pipe Band
Stuart Tosh, drummer, songwriter and vocalist
Trashcan Sinatras
Travis, band
Treacherous Orchestra, 12-piece Celtic fusion band
Trembling Bells
KT Tunstall
Alison Turriff, classical/folk fusion clarinettist
The Twilight Sad
Twin Atlantic

U
Ultra-Sonic, electronic music band
The Uncle Devil Show, pop-rock guitar band
Uncle John & Whitelock, horror punk band
Under the Dome, ambient music band
Unicorn Kid, Oliver Sabin, DJ / chiptune producer
Unkle Bob, indie rock band
The Unwinding Hours, alternative rock band
Midge Ure
Urusei Yatsura, band

V
The Valves, band
The Vaselines, band
Ewen Vernal
The View, band
Peter-John Vettese, keyboardist of Jethro Tull (1982–1986)
VUKOVI, rock band

W
Julian Wagstaff, contemporary classical composer
The Wake
Gordon Walker, bagpiper and pipe major
Gordon Waller (singer) half of the duo Peter and Gordon
Sheila Walsh
Keith Warwick
The Waterboys
Colin Waterson, electronic musician
Lori Watson, fiddle player and folk singer 
Anna Watt (1923-2009), singer from Fran and Anna
Fran Watt (1922-2003), singer from Fran and Anna
Kerri Watt, singer-songwriter and multi-instrumentalist 
We Are the Physics, indie band
We Were Promised Jetpacks, Glasgow based indie band
Sheena Wellington, traditional Scottish singer
Bobby Wellins, jazz saxophonist
Bill Wells, bassist, pianist, guitarist and composer
Euan Wemyss, lead singer of Captain Face
The Wendys
Wensdy
John Harley Weston, singer-songwriter
Wet Wet Wet
Nancy Whiskey (1935–2003), folk singer
Andy White, session drummer, famously stood in for Ringo Starr
Doogie White
Tam White, blues singer
White Trash, signed to Apple Records, later changed their name to Trash
Whiteout
Astrid Williamson
Duncan Williamson (1928–2007), storyteller and singer
Robin Williamson, a founding member of The Incredible String Band
Roy Williamson, founding member of The Corries and writer of Flower of Scotland
Paul Wilson, bass guitarist for Snow Patrol
Ray Wilson, lead singer in Stiltskin and in Genesis between 1996 and 1998
Robert Wilson
Thomas Wilson Composer
Win, pop band
Withered Hand, solo and band vehicle for Dan Willson of Edinburgh
Wolfstone
Stuart Wood, guitarist for the Bay City Rollers
Eric Woolfson, The Alan Parsons Project's founder member, vocalist and lyricist
Roddy Woomble
Writing on the Wall, rock band

X
The Xcerts, band
Sophie Xeon (1986 –2021), musician, record producer, singer, songwriter, and DJ. Better known as Sophie

Y
Y'all is Fantasy Island, alternative folk band
Yashin, post-hardcore band
Yasmin, DJ, singer, songwriter
James Yorkston
Alexander Young, eldest of the Young brothers, founding member of Grapefruit
Angus Young, lead guitarist, songwriter, and co-founder of the hard rock band AC/DC
Young Fathers, alternative hip hop group
John Paul Young
Kenneth Young, video game composer and musician
Malcolm Young, founding member, rhythm guitarist, backing vocalist and co-songwriter for the hard rock band AC/DC
Stevie Young, nephew of the Young brothers; member of AC/DC, former member of Starfighters
The Yummy Fur, indie rock band

Z
Lena Zavaroni (1963–99)
The Zephyrs, indie band
Zoey Van Goey, band
Zones, power pop and new wave band

References

 
Lists of Scottish people by occupation
Scottish musicians